Sergio Morales Retamal was the 22nd and 24th Mayor of the commune of Pichilemu, office which he first held between May 1950 and May 1951, and later between May 1953 and May 1956. Morales also held office as regidor of Pichilemu for two terms.

Political career
Morales Retamal was elected mayor of Pichilemu for the 1950–53 term, and took office on 21 May 1950. He divided his term in a "gentleman's agreement" with Olga Maturana Espinosa, who became the first (and until now, the only) woman mayor of Pichilemu following Sergio Morales' resignation in May 1951. He then completed his term as a regidor. He was re-elected for the 1953–56 term, and took office on 17 May 1953. He left office on 20 May 1956. For the 1956–59 and 1959–63 terms, he was elected regidor of Pichilemu.

Personal life
Morales was the son of Alberto Morales Moraga, who also was Mayor of Pichilemu. He held office between March and May 1935, and later that year between September and December, following the death of Serafín López Lizana.

References

Year of birth missing
Year of death missing
Mayors of Pichilemu